Waking up early is rising before most others and has also been described as a productivity method - rising early and consistently so as to be able to accomplish more during the day. This method has been recommended since antiquity and is now recommended by a number of personal development gurus.

Commentary 

Within the context of religious observances, spiritual writers have called this practice "the heroic minute", referring to the sacrifice which this entails.

The philosopher Aristotle wrote in his Economics that "Rising before daylight is also to be commended; it is a healthy habit, and gives more time for the management of the household as well as for liberal studies."

Benjamin Franklin is quoted to have said: "Early to bed and early to rise, makes a man healthy, wealthy, and wise". It is a saying that is viewed as a commonsensical proverb, which was included in "A Method of Prayer" by Mathew Henry who also listed it as a phrase "long said."  Franklin is also quoted as saying: "The early morning has gold in its mouth", a translation of the German proverb "Morgenstund hat Gold im Mund".

"The early bird gets the worm" is a proverb that suggests that getting up early will lead to success during the day. 
Which brings to mind the immediate counterpoint: "what about the early worm, shouldn't he have stayed in bed?"

James Thurber, in his book Fables for our Time, ended the Fable of the Shrike: "Early to rise and early to bed, makes a Shrike healthy, and wealthy, and dead".

Criticisms 

Such recommendations may cast individuals with different natural sleep patterns as lazy or unmotivated when it is a much different matter for a person with a longer or delayed sleep cycle to get up earlier in the morning than for a person with an advanced sleep cycle.  In effect, the person accustomed to a later wake time is being asked not to wake up an hour early but 3–4 hours early, while waking up "normally" may already be an unrecognized challenge imposed by the environment.

The bias toward early morning can also adversely affect adolescents in particular.  Teenagers tend to require at least 9 full hours of sleep each night, and changes to the endocrine system during puberty shift the natural wake time later in the morning.  Enforcing early start times despite this can have negative effects on mood, academic performance, and social skills.

See also 
 Lark

References

External links 

 
 Early to Rise by Benjamin Franklin

Personal development
Sleep
Morning